Philip Ryan  was an Irish Anglican priest.

Ryan was born in County Tipperary and educated at Trinity College, Dublin. He was appointed Vicar choral and a prebendary of Lismore Cathedral, Ireland in 1802. In 1805 he became Rector of St. George's Church, Dublin. In 1810 he was appointed Archdeacon of Lismore, serving until  his death in 1828.

Notes

1828 deaths
19th-century Irish Anglican priests
Archdeacons of Lismore
Alumni of Trinity College Dublin
People from County Tipperary